Ajin Panjapan (11 October 1927 – 17 November 2018) was a Thai writer, best known for his Tine Mine series of short stories, based on his experiences in the tin dredging operations of Phang-nga Province. He also wrote articles, novels, radio and television dramas, poetry, and songs, and edited and co-published Fah Muang Thai, a highly successful weekly literary magazine which launched the careers of many Thai writers. Ajin was named National Artist in literature in 1991.

See also
The Tin Mine, a 2005 film adaptation of the short story series written by Ajin

References

Ajin Panjapan
Ajin Panjapan
Ajin Panjapan
Ajin Panjapan
1927 births
2018 deaths